The 2013 FA WSL was the third season of the FA WSL, the top-level women's football league of England. The season began on 14 April and ended on 29 September.

Arsenal were the defending champions, having won their ninth consecutive English title last season. The top two teams qualified for the 2014–15 UEFA Women's Champions League.

The season was the last before the creation of a second division of the WSL. All teams had to reapply for a place in WSL 1 in the next season. Doncaster Belles were the only current WSL team not granted a WSL 1 place, thus they played in the WSL 2 the following season.  This decision had already been taken before Doncaster finished the season bottom of the WSL with the lowest points tally, as no relegation to the WSL 2 based on points was scheduled until the WSL 2 had completed its inaugural season to produce a corresponding promotion team. The reason for Doncaster's relegation from WSL 1 was a failed reapplication based on financial criteria, which is an aspect of the WSL the FA monitors very closely since it funds the participating teams and the teams must regularly prove they can match the FA funding. The Belles' place in the top flight the following season was taken by the Manchester City Ladies team from the FA Women's Premier League National Division, but now re-branded as Manchester City Women. Likewise, Lincoln Ladies retained their place in WSL 1 but relocated and re-branded as Notts County Ladies for the following season.

Teams 
The same teams as last season returned, as there was no relegation system in place.

Liverpool, who finished bottom in 2011 and 2012, relocated from Skelmersdale to the Halton Stadium in Widnes prior to the 2013 season as part of an ambitious programme of investment. Lincoln Ladies left Ashby Avenue to return full-time to Sincil Bank.

League table

Results

Top scorers

League Cup
The WSL Continental Cup was played in the same format as last year. Arsenal won their third title in as many editions with a 2–0 win over Lincoln.

Group 1

Group 2

Knockout stage

References

External links
Official website
Season on soccerway.com

Women's Super League seasons
1
1